University of Co-operative and Management,Sagaing is a public university in the Sagaing township of Sagaing Division, Myanmar.

The university offers a Bachelor of Business Science (B.B.Sc.) with five specializations, postgraduate diplomas (PGDip) and master's programmes. The university accepts 300 students annually for their four-year degree programmes.

The campus is located in the Shwe Thamar Quarter, Sagaing. Sagaing Co-operative University Students' Union claims student right and university's master plan to expand the main road and to build the student hostel.

History 
In 1982, it was established as "Sagaing Co-operative Training School as a compound training school from Chin State, Kachin State and Sagaing Division. In 1996, it was upgraded to a co-operative college. In 2012, President U Thein Sein visited Sagaing and gave a chance to be a special university in Sagaing. The construction of the main building was started as soon as Co-operative University (Sagaing) was recognized by the government.

Academic departments 
Department of Economics
Department of Commerce
Department of Statistics
Department of Management Studies
Department of Co-operative Studies
Department of ICT
Department of Burmese
Department of English
Department of Mathematics
Department of Law
Department of Economic Geography

Degrees and Diplomas 
The university offers a bachelor's programme for Business Science (B.B.Sc.) with five specialisations:

B.B.Sc. (Accounting & Finance)
B.B.Sc. (Applied Statistics)
B.B.Sc. (Marketing Management)
B.B.Sc. (Regional Development)
B.B.Sc. (Social Enterprise Management)

The university also offers postgraduate diploma courses in these specialisations. Additionally, the following master's programmes are offered by the university:
Master of Accounting and Finance
Master of Applied Statistics
Master of Marketing Management
Master of Regional Development
Master of Social Enterprise Management

References

External links 
 

Universities and colleges in Sagaing Region